This is a timeline of the early history of Islam during the lifetime of Muhammad. The information provided in this article is based  Islamic oral tradition, not on historical or archaeological evidence.
A separate list of military expeditions and battles is at List of expeditions of Muhammad.

See also
List of expeditions of Muhammad
 Timeline of Medina

References

Islam-related lists
Life of Muhammad
7th-century Islam
Timelines of Muslim history